John Scott, 2nd Earl of Eldon (10 December 1805 – 18 September 1854) was a British peer and Tory politician.

Background and education
Eldon was the only child of John Scott (1774–1805), MP for Boroughbridge, the only son of Lord Chancellor John Scott, 1st Earl of Eldon. His father died when he was only two weeks old. His mother was Henrietta Elizabeth, daughter of Sir Matthew White Ridley, 2nd Baronet. He was educated at Winchester and New College, Oxford.

Political career
Eldon sat as Member of Parliament for Truro from 1828 to 1831. In 1838 he succeeded his grandfather in the earldom and entered the House of Lords.

Family
Lord Eldon married Louisa, daughter of Charles Duncombe, 1st Baron Feversham, in 1831. They had one son and six daughters. She died in November 1852. Lord Eldon survived her by two years and died in September 1854, aged 48. He was succeeded in the earldom by his only son, John.

References

External links

1805 births
1854 deaths
Earls in the Peerage of the United Kingdom
Members of the Parliament of the United Kingdom for Truro
UK MPs 1826–1830
UK MPs 1830–1831
UK MPs who inherited peerages
Tory MPs (pre-1834)
Scott family (England)